The Fly may refer to:

Film and theatre
 The Fly (1958 film), American science-fiction horror film
 The Fly (1986 film), a remake of the 1958 film
 The Fly II, a 1989 sequel to the 1986 film
 The Fly (opera), a 2008 opera by Howard Shore, based on the 1986 film
 The Fly (1968 film), Yugoslavian cartoon
 The Fly (1980 film), Hungarian animated short film

Music
 "The Fly" (Chubby Checker song), 1961
 "The Fly" (U2 song), 1991
 The Fly, an import compilation CD by Rush
 "The Fly", a song by Sarah Brightman

Print media
 The Fly (magazine), free British music magazine
 Fly (Archie Comics), also called Fly Man
 Human Fly (comics), a Marvel Comics character, the first of whom was also known as The Fly

Short stories and adaptations 
 "The Fly" (Mansfield), 1922 short story by Katherine Mansfield
 "The Fly" (Langelaan), a 1957 short story by George Langelaan

Sports
 The Fly (climb), a climbing route
 Guy Williams (basketball) (born 1960), American basketball player, nicknamed "The Fly"

Other
 Drosophila melanogaster, the (best-studied) fly
 "The Fly" (poem), a 1794 poem by William Blake
 The Fly, an Atari 2600 game
 The Fly (roller coaster), a roller coaster at Canada's Wonderland
 The Fly (lake)

See also
 Fly (disambiguation)